Miraces is a genus of skeletonizing leaf beetles in the family Chrysomelidae. There are six described species in Miraces. They are found in North America and the Neotropics.

Species
These six species belong to the genus Miraces:
 Miraces aeneipennis Jacoby, 1888
 Miraces barberi (Blake, 1951)
 Miraces dichroa (Suffrian, 1868)
 Miraces glaber (Blake, 1946}
 Miraces modesta (Horn, 1893)
 Miraces placida (Horn, 1893)

References

Further reading

 
 
 

Galerucinae
Chrysomelidae genera
Articles created by Qbugbot
Taxa named by Martin Jacoby